Ye Yifei (born 16 June 2000) is a Chinese racing driver, 2016 French F4 champion, 2020 Euroformula Open champion, 2021 Asian Le Mans Series champion, 2021 European Le Mans Series champion, and former member of the Renault Sport Academy. In October 2021, Ye signed with Porsche and has been named as a Porsche Motorsport Asia Pacific selected driver.

Early career
Ye was born in Xi'an, the capital city of Shannxi Province. He began his karting in 2010 at the age of ten, winning the 2011 and 2012 All Chinese karting championships. In 2013, Ye made his European debut through ROK Cup International Final and finished 4th a year later.

Open Wheel Racing Career

Formula 4
In 2015, Ye graduated to single-seaters in the French F4 Championship, where two wins near the end of the campaign brought him to twelfth in the standings.

Ye returned to French F4 the following year. He experienced a dominant season, winning 14 races and taking the title.

Formula Renault 2.0
In December 2016, it was announced Ye would graduate to Formula Renault 2.0 with team champions Josef Kaufmann Racing. He had three podium finishes on his way to the eighth place in the drivers' standings. Ye reunited with JKR the following season, claiming two wins at Monza and the Hungaroring to finish the championship third overall.

FIA Formula 3 Championship
In October 2018, Ye joined the final round of the F3 Asian Championship with Absolute Racing and rejoined the outfit for the following year's Winter Series, where he claimed three wins and finished as the runner-up.

2019 saw Ye progressing to the FIA Formula 3 Championship with Hitech Grand Prix, having joined the Renault Sport Academy over the off-season.

Euroformula Open Championship 
In May 2020, Ye joined CryptoTower Racing Team and had 11 wins, 13 poles and 12 fastest laps. With his dominant performance, Ye claimed the 2020 Euroformula Open Championship title.

Sportscar Racing Career

2021: Impressive rookie season 
At the start of 2021, Ye made his sportscar racing debut with G-Drive Racing, partnering René Binder and Ferdinand Habsburg in the LMP2 category of the Asian Le Mans Series. Having taken a pair of victories at the opening round and consolidated their championship gap during the final two races, the trio claimed the ALMS title.

For his main campaign, Ye would drive for Team WRT alongside Louis Delétraz and Robert Kubica in the European Le Mans Series. The team started off in controlling fashion, winning the opening pair of races at Barcelona and Spielberg and gaining an early lead in the standings. After two finishes inside the top five, the Chinese driver and his teammates took victory at Spa-Francorchamps, thus clinching the ELMS championship with a round to go.

Team WRT (24 Hours of Le Mans) 
In August 2021, Ye shares Team WRT's Oreca 07 LMP2 car with Louis Delétraz and Robert Kubica to compete in 2021 24 Hours of Le Mans. Ye completed the most overtakes in LMP2 class during the 24 Hours of Le Mans with 315 passes. However, due to an electrical short, was stopped after the Dunlop bridge at the last lap of the race. Car No. 41, which led the LMP2 class at the time with Ye at the wheel, was unable to finish the race, and was therefore unclassified in the final results.

Herberth Motorsport (Asian Le Mans Series) 
In January 2022, it was announced that the 21 years old Chinese driver Porsche Motorsport Asian Pacific Selected Driver Ye among Herberth Motorsport crew sharing the Porsche 911 GT3 R with Antares Au and Klaus Bachler.

Cool Racing (European Le Mans Series) 

In February 2022, Cool Racing announced its driver line-up for 2022. Reigning European Le Mans Series LMP2 Champion Ye along with the four-time winner in Le Mans Nicolas Lapierre and 2021 European Le Mans Series LMP3 runner up Niklas Krütten. The team also entered the car in the 2022 24 Hours of Le Mans with a revised line-up due to Lapierre's commitments with Alpine in the FIA WEC. He was replaced by double IMSA champion Ricky Taylor.

Hertz Team Jota (World Endurance Championship) 
Ye will compete in the FIA World Endurance Championship in 2023, becoming part of the Hertz Team Jota Hypercar programme alongside António Félix da Costa and Will Stevens.

Karting record

Karting career summary

Racing record

Racing career summary

† As Ye was a guest driver, he was ineligible for points.

Complete French F4 Championship results 
(key) (Races in bold indicate pole position) (Races in italics indicate fastest lap)

Complete Formula Renault Eurocup results
(key) (Races in bold indicate pole position) (Races in italics indicate fastest lap)

Complete FIA Formula 3 Championship results
(key) (Races in bold indicate pole position; races in italics indicate points for the fastest lap of top ten finishers)

Complete Euroformula Open Championship results 
(key) (Races in bold indicate pole position) (Races in italics indicate fastest lap)

Complete European Le Mans Series results
(key) (Races in bold indicate pole position; results in italics indicate fastest lap)

Complete 24 Hours of Le Mans results

Complete FIA World Endurance Championship results
(key) (Races in bold indicate pole position; races in italics indicate fastest lap)

References

External links

 
Ye Yifei on Weibo
Ye Yifei on Twitter
Profile on Euroformula Open Championship

2000 births
Living people
Chinese racing drivers
French F4 Championship drivers
Italian F4 Championship drivers
Formula Renault Eurocup drivers
Formula Renault 2.0 NEC drivers
FIA Formula 3 Championship drivers
F3 Asian Championship drivers
Euroformula Open Championship drivers
FIA World Endurance Championship drivers
24 Hours of Le Mans drivers
European Le Mans Series drivers
Asian Le Mans Series drivers
Auto Sport Academy drivers
Mücke Motorsport drivers
Josef Kaufmann Racing drivers
Hitech Grand Prix drivers
Motopark Academy drivers
W Racing Team drivers
G-Drive Racing drivers
Porsche Motorsports drivers
Jota Sport drivers